John Ruan (1813 – May 14, 1892) was an Irish-American pioneer and politician who served as a member of the Wisconsin State Assembly in 1855 and 1860.

Early life 
Ruan was born in County Mayo, Ireland in 1813.

Career 
Along with his wife, Catherine Clar, he emigrated to the United States in 1834, landing in New York City. After living there for two years, he moved to Illinois in 1836. There, he worked as a foreman, helping to build the Illinois and Michigan Canal.

Ruan visited Milwaukee, Wisconsin in 1839, staying with the family of Matthew Keenan. His visit to the city persuaded him to purchase  of land in Milwaukee County in May 1841. Once in the county, he became involved in civic life. Ruan served in the Wisconsin State Assembly in 1855 and 1860; served one year as a supervisor of the Oak Creek, Wisconsin in the 1870s; and was elected as County Superintendent of Schools for Milwaukee County in 1880.

Personal life 
Ruan was a Democrat and a practicing Roman Catholic.

Notes

1813 births
1892 deaths
19th-century Irish people
19th-century Roman Catholics
Politicians from County Mayo
Democratic Party members of the Wisconsin State Assembly
Irish emigrants to the United States (before 1923)
People from Milwaukee County, Wisconsin
19th-century American politicians